The Interregional Primary Plan is a proposed reform to the United States primary calendar supported by Representative Sandy Levin and Senator Bill Nelson, both Democrats. The plan would break the country into six regions. From those regions, one subregion - either a single state or a group of smaller states - would vote on each primary date (e.g., all A states,) with the entire country having held its primaries after the sixth set of primaries votes. Each state would vote first once every twenty-four years, with the first set of primaries determined by lottery and cycled thereafter.

Historically, the presidential primary season started slowly, ramping up several weeks after the Iowa caucuses and the New Hampshire primary. In the 2008 Presidential primary season, with competition to increase the relevance of each state's selection process, 34 states (plus the District of Columbia), have scheduled their primary or caucus process to be held in January and February, tripling the number of states voting this early than the count in the 2000 races.

Proposed dates
1st Primaries: Second Tuesday in March
2nd Primaries: First Tuesday in April
3rd Primaries: Fourth Tuesday in April
4th Primaries: Second Tuesday in May
5th Primaries: Fourth Tuesday in May
6th Primaries: Second Tuesday in June

Proposed Regions

Criticisms

Travel time

The interregional plan would prevent any cost savings from travel or common media markets.  Each primary date would be national in geographic scope.  This is directly counter to the goal of many plans is to allow for entry of less-funded candidates early on.

Varying primary size

With random assignment to groups within each region, any given primary date could be as small as 29 congressional districts, or as large as 167 (out of 435) districts (if the random draw were to pick CA, TX, NY, FL, IL, and PA together).

With this variation in size comes a variation in importance.  If a medium-sized state like Maryland (8 districts) were paired up with California in a 130-district primary, the state would have little importance.  If, on the other hand, it were paired up with smaller states in a 45-district primary, Maryland would suddenly be center-stage.

With some rigging, the six primaries can be set to between 70 and 79 districts each, but again whoever gets paired with California is largely ignored.

See also
 United States presidential primary
 United States presidential election
 United States presidential election debates
 American presidential debate
 United States presidential nominating convention
 United States Electoral College
Early Votes
 Ames (Iowa) Straw Poll on a Saturday in August prior to the election year, since 1979
 Iowa caucus first official election year event since 1972
 New Hampshire primary first national primary stop since 1952
Reform Plans
 United States presidential primary reform proposals
 Graduated Random Presidential Primary System
 Rotating Regional Primary System
 Delaware Plan
 National Primary

References

External links
 FairVote.org: Interregional Primary Plan 

United States presidential primaries